The Nino Bixio class was a pair of protected cruisers built for the Italian Regia Marina (Royal Navy) in the 1910s. They were intended to serve as scouts for the main Italian fleet, and as such required a high top speed. They were overweight as built, which prevented them from reaching their intended maximum speed. They were a disappointment in service, especially compared to the earlier—and faster—cruiser , which cut their careers short.

Both ships saw limited action during World War I, largely a result of the cautious strategies employed by the Regia Marina and its opponent, the Austro-Hungarian Navy. Nino Bixio was involved in the pursuit of a group of Austro-Hungarian raiders in December 1915, but did not engage them before they escaped. Marsala briefly battled Austro-Hungarian cruisers during the Battle of the Otranto Straits in May 1917. Both ships were sold for scrapping in the late 1920s, the victims of very tight naval budgets and their own poor performance.

Design

General characteristics and machinery

The ships of the Nino Bixio class were designed as fleet scouts by Engineering Captain Giuseppe Rota, along similar lines to the cruiser . The ships were fitted with a pair of pole masts equipped with spotting tops located at the forward and aft conning tower. Their crew consisted 13 officers and 283 enlisted men.

The ships' propulsion system consisted of three Curtiss steam turbines, each driving a screw propeller. Steam was provided by fourteen mixed coal and oil firing Blechynden boilers that were trunked into four funnels; the first two were closely spaced just aft of the foremast and the other two were farther spaced further aft.

Armament
The ships were armed with a main battery of six  L/50 guns mounted singly. Two were placed side by side forward, with the other four located on the centerline, two amidships and two in a superfiring pair aft of the mainmast. The amidships guns were placed en echelon, and were spaced with the funnels so as to allow them to fire across the deck. The ships were also equipped with a secondary battery of six  L/50 guns, the same Pattern ZZI type guns used on the Italian dreadnoughts, which provided close range defense against torpedo boats. They had a rate of fire of 15 shells per minute. They were also armed with two  torpedo tubes submerged in the hull. The ships were also fitted with equipment to store and launch 200 naval mines.

Ships

Service history

Nino Bixio had entered service just before the start of World War I in July 1914, but Italy had initially declared neutrality at the start of the conflict, despite having been allied to Germany and Austria-Hungary. By May 1915, the Triple Entente had convinced the Italian government to enter the war against their erstwhile allies. The main Italian fleet was kept at the southern end of the Adriatic, at Brindisi, and in the Mediterranean, at Taranto, where it would be safe from Austro-Hungarian U-boats. The Austro-Hungarians, meanwhile, employed a fleet in being strategy while conducting raids with small craft and U-boats. For the duration of the war, Nino Bixio and Marsala were stationed at Brindisi, where they could quickly respond to Austro-Hungarian raids. In December 1915, Nino Bixio and several other warships, including British cruisers, sortied in response to an Austro-Hungarian attack on transports supplying the Serbian Army through Albania. Nino Bixio pursued the cruiser  before the latter escaped under cover of darkness.

Marsala saw action during the Battle of the Otranto Straits in May 1917, though Nino Bixio did not have steam up in her boilers when the Austro-Hungarians attacked, so she was unable to join her sister ship. Marsala briefly clashed with the Austro-Hungarian cruisers before Rear Admiral Alfredo Acton, the Italian commander, broke off the engagement following the arrival of the powerful Austro-Hungarian armored cruiser . The demobilizations and funding cuts that followed the end of the war in 1918 continued into the 1920s for the Regia Marina, and disposing of the two Nino Bixio class ships, which had never met design expectations, was an easy means to trim the naval budget. Nino Bixio and Marsala were stricken from the naval register in March 1929 and November 1927, respectively, and were subsequently sold for scrap.

Footnotes

Notes

Citations

References

Further reading

External links
 Classe Nino Bixio Marina Militare website